Garda RFC is the rugby team with players drawn mostly from local areas of Westmanstown(Lucan, Leixlip, Dunboyne, Clonsilla, Castleknock, Blanchardstown) and members of Garda Síochána, the national police force of Ireland. It currently plays in Division 2B of the Leinster League.

History
The club was founded in February 1965 by rugby enthusiasts at the Garda Station in Pearse Street.

One of its first coaches was the former Ireland and British and Irish Lions prop, Gordon Wood, who was also the father of the rugby icon Keith Wood. His memory is honoured by the Gordon Wood Trophy, competed for annually by the Garda and the Irish Defence Forces rugby teams.

Other trophies contested by the club include the Eugene Crowley Cup against Monkstown, the Doyle Cup against Greystones, the Trevaskis Cup against Clontarf and the George Treiner Cup against Terenure.

Honours
 O'Connell Cup: 1968
 Spencer Cup: 1986, 1989, 1990, 1991, 1992, 1993, 1997, 2002, 2005
 Keating Cup: 1989
 Bill Marshal Trophy: 1989
 Leinster J2 League: 1997
 Leinster League Division Two: 2000
 Leinster League Division 1B Champions: 2011

References
 Garda RFC

Irish rugby union teams
Rugby clubs established in 1965
Rugby union clubs in Fingal